Dharma Manikya I, also known as Dangar Fa, was the Maharaja of Tripura from 1431 to 1462. His reign was notable for its territorial expansions as well as for his religious and cultural contributions.

Ascension
The eldest of the five sons of his father Maha Manikya, Dharma was not initially intended to inherit the throne. According to court histories, he had originally decided on a monastic life, abandoning material desires and embarking on pilgrimages as an itinerant mendicant. It was while he was visiting the holy city of Benares in 1431 that he received news of his father's death, as well as of the violent struggle for the vacant throne which had ensued among his brothers and the military leaders. The story continues that accompanied by eight Brahmins, Dharma hastened back to Tripura. There he was welcomed by the people and unanimously chosen as the next ruler.

Reign
Early in Dharma's reign, his territories were invaded by the Sultan of Bengal, Shamsuddin Ahmad Shah, who compelled a tribute of money and elephants. In turn, Dharma launched his own assault, occupying and plundering the city of Sonargaon. Further Bengali lands were attacked by his armies, with Patrikara, Gangamandal, Meherkul and Khandal all being annexed into Tripura. Around this time, Min Saw Mon, the exiled ruler of Arakan, visited the royal court. Dharma contributed both financially and militarily to the former's reconquest of his kingdom.

Traditions describe Dharma as a powerful administrator as well as a patron of learning and culture; the latter of which is most evident in his commissioning of the Rajmala, a history of the Manikya dynasty. His religious zeal is also notable, shown both through donations of large amounts of lands to Brahmins, as well as by his construction projects, which include temples and the famous Dharmasagar tank in Comilla.

Overthrow and death
Numismatic evidence suggests that Dharma is identical to the Tripura ruler referred to in the Rajmala as "Dangar Fa". This is due to coins bearing the name of Dangar Fa's supposed son and successor, Ratna Manikya I (mistakenly identified as Dharma's great-grandfather in the text), place the latter's reign as being immediately after that of Dharma. This would suggest that Dharma was in fact Ratna Manikya's father and that episodes linked with "Dangar Fa" in the Rajmala are instead associated with him.

Thus, according to the events narrated in the chronicle, Dharma divided his kingdom into seventeen parts, each to be parcelled to all but the youngest of his eighteen sons. The shunned son, Ratna, was instead given as a hostage to the Sultan of Bengal, Rukunuddin Barbak Shah. However, Ratna allied with the Sultan and launched an invasion of Tripura, defeating his father and brothers. While his other sons were imprisoned, Dharma himself was expelled from the kingdom by the new monarch. He eventually died in exile on the Thanamchi hill, to the east of Tripura.

Notes

References

Bibliography

Kings of Tripura
History of Tripura